Mount Gayong (Malay: Gunung Gayong) is the fourth highest mountain in the Malay Peninsula, at 2,173 metres. It can be reached in about an hour's trek from the peak of Mount Korbu, the second highest mountain in Peninsular Malaysia.

It is a favourite site for mountain climbing.

References

Gayong